The Desert Beaver Observatory (IAU code 919) is a private astronomical observatory near Eloy, Arizona. The asteroid 25893 Sugihara was discovered at the Desert Beaver Observatory on 2 October 2000 by Canadian amateur astronomer William Kwong Yu Yeung.

See also
List of astronomical observatories

References

Astronomical observatories in Arizona
Buildings and structures in Pinal County, Arizona